Cho Ji-hun (born 29 May 1990) is a South Korean football midfielder.

Honours

Club
Chiangrai United
 Thai FA Cup (1): 2020–21

References
 https://int.soccerway.com/players/ji-hoon-cho/178337/

External links

1990 births
Living people
South Korean footballers
Association football midfielders
South Korean expatriate footballers
Expatriate footballers in Thailand
South Korean expatriate sportspeople in Thailand
Suwon Samsung Bluewings players
Gimcheon Sangmu FC players
Gangwon FC players
FC Seoul players
Cho Ji-hun
K League 1 players
Cho Ji-hun
Yonsei University alumni